Krasnovishersk is a town and the administrative center of Krasnovishersky District in Perm Krai, Russia, located on the western slopes of the Northern Urals,  north of Perm, the administrative center of the krai. As of the 2010 Census, its population was 16,099.

Geography
The Vishera River flows through the town.

History
The town grew out of the settlement of Vizhaikha. Since 1926, the location where the town now stands served as the 4th branch of the Solovki prison camp, and since 1929—as the independent management of the Vishera camps. Krasnovishersk was officially established in 1930, the same year when a paper mill was built. Town status was granted to Krasnovishersk in 1942.

A memorial to Varlam Shalamov was erected in Krasnovishersk in June 2007 on the site of his first labor camp.

Administrative and municipal status
Within the framework of administrative divisions, Krasnovishersk serves as the administrative center of Krasnovishersky District, to which it is directly subordinated. As a municipal division, the town of Krasnovishersk, together with five rural localities, is incorporated within Krasnovishersky Municipal District as Krasnovisherskoye Urban Settlement.

Economy
The town's industries include timber and woodworking, as well as ferrous metallurgy. Until 2006, the main employer was the Visherabumprom paper mill, which went bankrupt and was closed.

An Uralalmaz mine extracts high-quality diamonds near Krasnovishersk.

Transportation
There is no direct railway link with town; the nearest station is in Solikamsk. The town is served by the Krasnovishersk Airport, which is currently inactive.

Demographics
Ethnically, 88.4% of the town's population are Russians, 0.5% are Ukrainians, 0.3% are Tatars, and 0.3% are Belarusians.

References

Notes

Sources

Cities and towns in Perm Krai
Populated places in Krasnovishersky District
Monotowns in Russia